The NASA Human Exploration Rover Challenge, prior to 2014 referred to as the Great Moonbuggy Race, is an annual competition for high school and college students to design, build, and race human-powered, collapsible vehicles over simulated lunar/Martian terrain.  NASA sponsors the competition, first held in 1994, and, since 1996, the U.S. Space & Rocket Center hosts.

Students created vehicles dubbed "moonbuggies" to face challenges similar to those engineers at NASA's Marshall Space Flight Center addressed in preparation for Apollo 15. On that mission, on July 31, 1971, the first Lunar Roving Vehicle extended the range of astronauts on the moon to allow for further exploration than was otherwise possible.  Two other rovers were sent to the moon on subsequent missions.

With the 2014 changes in the contest, the motivation changed to mimicking design challenges faced by engineers designing rovers for future exploration missions to a variety of celestial bodies.

The first race, in 1994, was held on July 16, the 25th anniversary of the Apollo 11 launch.  It featured six college teams who competed on the same course as had been used to test the lunar rovers previously.  The University of New Hampshire finished first, in 18 minutes 55 seconds for the  course with twelve obstacles. The prize was a trip for six team members to see a Space Shuttle launch. Other teams from the University of Puerto Rico at Humacao, Texas A & M University, the University of Alabama in Huntsville, Georgia Institute of Technology and Indiana University/Purdue University at Indianapolis participated.

Subsequent races have been held in April.  In 1996, the competition was moved to a  course at the U.S. Space & Rocket Center; high school teams also began competing.

Rules 
The rules change year by year, but are largely summarized thus:
 A team of at most six people designs, builds, and races the same vehicle.
 Two of the six must ride and propel the vehicle through the course.
 Riders must be one male and one female.
 The moonbuggy (pre-2014) must fit into a  cube and be no more than 4 ft wide.  Beginning in 2014, the rover constraint was a  cube.
 The vehicle needs to carry a simulated high-gain antenna, camera, and other instrumentation which must consume at least .
 Various other dimensional and safety criteria apply.
 Time penalties are assessed for touching the ground, avoiding obstacles, and other rule violations.
Since 2016, the teams have to design and fabricate their own non-pneumatic tires/wheels. Purchasing a commercially available product will lead to disqualification.

Course 

The course is designed to test rovers for stability over varying simulated lunar or extraterrestrial terrain—bumpy, sloped, and rocky—including some tight turns. The first course was the actual track used by Mobility Test Articles, auditioning versions of Lunar Roving Vehicles that were used on the moon. For the third race the course was moved a few miles, to the U.S. Space & Rocket Center. There, the track has taken varying paths through the rocket park and around the permanent lunar crater feature at the museum. Each year, the obstacles change slightly.

The obstacles are constructed of discarded tires, plywood, some 20 tons of gravel and five tons of sand, all to simulate lunar craters, basins, and rilles. The contest is challenging: in 2009, 29 of 68 teams competing did not complete the race. Sometimes the placement of the obstacle is an issue, with some teams hitting obstacles too fast after a downhill stint.

Before students tackle the race course, their vehicles must pass inspection. After the race, another inspection assesses the condition of the vehicle, with time penalties if parts are missing.

Contestants 
Contestants are high school and university students largely from the United States, including Puerto Rico. Teams have also come from Canada, Mexico, India, Germany, and Romania to participate.

Awards 
Numerous awards are offered each year, some with significant prizes.  First place college winners have received trips to Shuttle launches and cash prizes, while others have received weekends at Space Camp. In 2009, there were 11 categories for special recognition with 19 recipients thereof.  Consistent from the beginning have been awards for fastest time and for best design.  Other awards acknowledge simplicity of design, safety, tenacity, team spirit, improvement over previous years' entries, and exceptional new entries.

Winners 
This list gives winners for time(t) and design(d) awards which have been consistently offered since the start.  Awards were often also given for other categories but they are not included here in the interest of readability.

tFirst place for time
dBest design award
fFeatherweight award

References

External links 

 NASA Great Moonbuggy Race official site
 Public Affairs site
 Flickr images

Science competitions
U.S. Space & Rocket Center
Vehicle design
Competitions in the United States
Engineering competitions
Combination events